Gilles Fauconnier (19 August 1944 – 3 February 2021) was a French linguist, researcher in cognitive science, and author, who worked in the U.S.  He was distinguished professor at the University of California, San Diego, in the Department of Cognitive Science.

His work with Mark Turner founded the theory of conceptual blending.

His books include: 
 The Way We Think: Conceptual Blending and the Mind's Hidden Complexities (with Mark Turner) (2003)
 Conceptual Integration Networks (with Mark Turner) (1998)
 Mappings in Thought and Language (1997)
 Mental Spaces: Aspects of Meaning Construction in Natural Language (1994)

See also
 Cognitive science
 Conceptual blending

References

External links
 Papers by Gilles Fauconnier

1944 births
2021 deaths
French cognitive scientists
French science writers
University of California, San Diego faculty
Linguists from France
Metaphor theorists
French male writers